Leser Landshuth (15 January 1817 – 23 March 1887) was a German Jewish liturgiologist.

He went to Berlin as a youth to study Jewish theology, and there he became acquainted with Leopold Zunz and Abraham Geiger, the latter of whom was then staying in that city in order to become naturalized in Prussia. Landshuth soon gave up his intention of becoming a rabbi, not being willing to conceal or renounce his liberal opinions; and  aided him in establishing himself as a Hebrew bookseller.

Meanwhile, Landshuth kept up his literary activity; and in 1845 he published as an appendix to the prayer-book issued by Hirsch Edelmann ("Siddur Hegyon Leb"; commonly known as "Landshuth's Prayer-Book") an essay on the origin of Hebrew prayers. His essay on the Pesaḥ Haggadah (Berlin, 1855) and the introduction to the "Ma'abar Yabboḳ," a handbook of the funeral customs of the Jews, are along similar lines ("," Berlin, 1867). A number of inscriptions from the tomb-stones of prominent men are added to the latter work.

Landshuth's chief work was his "," on Hebrew liturgical poetry (2 vols., ib. 1857–62), a painstaking and important contribution to the subject. No less valuable are his works relating to the history of the Jewish community of Berlin, parts of which have been incorporated in Ludwig Geiger's "" (ib. 1871); other portions have been published in "Die Gegenwart" (ib. 1867) and other periodicals. He published also "," history of the Berlin rabbis 1671–1871 (ib. 1884).

Landshuth also copied and arranged the early communal archives of Berlin (written in Hebrew) and the inscriptions of the old cemetery in that city, which was closed in 1827.

References

Ha-Asif, 1888, pp. 25–29.

1817 births
1887 deaths
People from Leszno
19th-century German Jews
Liturgists
Jewish historians
19th-century German historians
German male non-fiction writers
People from the Grand Duchy of Posen
19th-century male writers